The Universal College - Aley (UCA; Al - Jamiaa Al Wataniya) was founded in 1907 and operated as a K–12 institution for many decades as an independent college preparatory school.

In 1983, UCA was forced to close its doors to students due to the impact of many years of political unrest in Lebanon and the resulting war damage to the campus and the surrounding areas. But after things stabilized, a new Universal College in Aley opened its doors to students for the first time since 1983 on October 4, 2001 as a member of the Esol Education.

Accreditation 

The school is privately owned and approved to operate by the Lebanese Ministry of Education.  The school is fully accredited by the Middle States Association of Colleges and Schools (Philadelphia, Pennsylvania).

Curriculum 

UCA is an independent college preparatory school that offers two distinct academic tracks, leading to either the Lebanese Baccalaureate or the American Diploma. Instruction, with the exception of  Arabic, French, and Arabic Social Studies, is in English. American textbooks are used in all core academic programs, and academic support is provided to students in the form of tutoring services and second language instruction.

Languages Offered 

 English
 Arabic

Extra curricular Activities 

 Drama Club
 Dance Club
 Model United Nations (MUN)
 Model Arab League (MAL)
 Yearbook Club
 Choir
 Band 
 Music
 Drama
 Craft Club
 Broadway
 Writing Center 
 Yoga

Athletics 

 Soccer
 Basketball
 Physical Outdoors Games

Campus Facilities

 Tennis courts
 Basketball Court
 Football Court
 Theatre

Memberships 

 European Council of International Schools (ECIS)
 National Honor Society (NHS)
 Mediterranean Association of International Schools (MAIS)
 Near-east South Asia Association of International Schools (NESA)
 Central Eastern European Schools Association (CEESA)

External links

References

International schools in Lebanon
Private schools in Lebanon
Educational institutions established in 1907
1907 establishments in the Ottoman Empire